Kamalabad Rural District is in the Central District of Karaj County, Alborz province, Iran. At the census of 2006, its population was 3,836 in 1,090 households, and in the most recent census of 2016, it had increased to 4,892 in 1,636 households. The largest of its six villages was Mahmudabad, with 3,817 people.

References 

Karaj County

Rural Districts of Alborz Province

Populated places in Alborz Province

Populated places in Karaj County